Carol Skricki (born July 27, 1962 in Norwood, Massachusetts) is an American rower. Along with Ruth Davidon she finished 4th in the women's double sculls at the 2000 Summer Olympics.

References 
 
 

1962 births
Living people
American female rowers
People from Norwood, Massachusetts
Olympic rowers of the United States
Rowers at the 2000 Summer Olympics
World Rowing Championships medalists for the United States
21st-century American women